The Ambassador of the Kingdom of Serbia to the Kingdom of Bulgaria was the Kingdom of Serbia's foremost diplomatic representative to the Kingdom of Bulgaria. As Ambassador Extraordinary and Plenipotentiary, he was head of the Kingdom of Serbia's diplomatic mission. The position started in February 1914 after diplomatic relations between the Kingdom of Bulgaria and Serbia were restored following the war between the two kingdoms. The position disappeared after Bulgaria, together with Austria-Hungary and Germany, invaded and occupied Serbia in 1915, and the creation of the Kingdom of Serbs, Croats and Slovenes, future Kingdom of Yugoslavia, in 1918.

List of heads of mission

Envoy Extraordinary and Minister Plenipotentiary to the Kingdom of Bulgaria

References

Bulgaria
Serbia
Serbia diplomacy-related lists